Sue Foster is an English former snooker player. She won the Women's World Snooker Championship in 1983.

Career
Foster, from Tamworth, was runner-up in the Pontins women's championships three times, in 1977, 1978 and 1982; and was national women's champion in 1980, 1982 and 1983.

The 1983 Women's World Snooker Championship was sponsored by Pontins and held at their Brean Sands Holiday Park, Burnham-on-Sea, Somerset. Foster won the tournament, and the £2,000 prize, by defeating Maureen Baynton, from Ewell, 8–5 in the final. The Observer noted that this was £28,000 less than the £30,000 that Steve Davis received for winning the men's World Snooker Championship that season.

Foster had reached the semi-final in 1981, where she lost 0–3 to Vera Selby. In 1980 she lost 0–3 to Natalie Stelmach in the quarter-final. She retired from competitive snooker in 1984.

Achievements

Women's Snooker – Individual

References

External links 
 Sue Foster interviewed by John Swallow, for ATV Today, 23 June 1981.

Living people
English snooker players
Female snooker players
Year of birth missing (living people)
Sportspeople from Tamworth, Staffordshire